Sinikithemba Choir is an all-female HIV-positive South African choir. They were brought to US by Tim Janis. The group's solo discography includes the album Living Hope 2003.

References

South African musical groups